Nogi or NOGI may refer to:

Places
Nogi, Tochigi, a town in Tochigi Prefecture
Nogi Station (Tochigi), a railway station in Nogi
Nogi District, Shimane
Nogi Station (Shimane), a railway station in Shimane Prefecture
Nogi Shrine (Tokyo)

Other uses
NOGI Awards, presented to divers by the U.S. Academy of Underwater Arts and Sciences

People with the surname
Nogi Maresuke (1849–1912), a Japanese general

See also
NogiBingo! a Japanese television variety show
European Nogi Brazilian Jiu Jitsu Championship